Blood/Candy is the seventh studio album by American alternative rock band The Posies, released on September 28, 2010, by Rykodisc.  It was the band's first album release in five years, following Every Kind of Light.

The Posies say this is something totally different from what they've tried before. "We subscribe to the 'evolve or perish' philosophy," co-founder Jon Auer says in a statement. "We directed ourselves to new places with this recording and tried not to travel down familiar paths when it could be avoided. Expect the unexpected"

"One of the things I was hoping to do on this record," says Auer, "was go back to the idea of Ken and me writing most of the songs, versus the last recording we did, where we kind of cobbled things together in the studio with everyone. I just felt like we needed to have that time to prepare and actually sit down and write." As a result, Stringfellow says, "I would say that I feel the songs on this one a bit deeper... there's stuff from way down in there that I think gives it a little more soul."

Track listing

Personnel
The Posies
Jon Auer - lead vocals, guitars
Ken Stringfellow - lead vocals, guitars, keyboards
Matt Harris - bass guitar
Darius Minwalla - drums

Additional musicians
Hugh Cornwell - vocals on "Plastic Paperbacks"
Kay Hanley - vocals on "The Glitter Prize"
Lisa Lobsinger vocals on "Licenses to Hide" 
Paco Loco - vocals on "Enewetak"
 Phil Peterson - string arrangements and cello on "Accidental Architecture", "Holiday Hours" and "The Glitter Prize"; trumpet on "Cleopatra Street"; flugelbone on "So Caroline"

Recorded & Mixed by: Paco Loco, Jon Auer, Ken Stringfellow, Scott Greiner, Martin Davis Kinack, Daniel Pasquel, Phil Peterson, and Michael Eisenstein at Studio Paco Loco, El Puerto de Santa Maria SPAIN; Le Domicile, Paris/Cussy-la-Colonne FRANCE; Amberson Mansion, SoDo/Seattle USA; Eminence Recording, Seattle USA; Down In The Hole, Paris FRANCE; Chillipeg-Winnewack Audio, in the woods, CANADA; La Increible Sociedad, Quito ECUADOR; The House Of Breaking Glass, Seattle USA; and The Rumpus Room, Los Angeles, USA

Mastered by Greg Calbi, Sterling Sound New York USA

References

The Posies albums
2010 albums
Rykodisc albums